The North Battleford Crown Colony (2011 population 164) is an unincorporated community within the Rural Municipality of North Battleford No. 437 in Saskatchewan, Canada that is designated a census subdivision by Statistics Canada. It is adjacent to the City of North Battleford and is home to the Saskatchewan Hospital North Battleford.

Geography 
Located within the Rural Municipality of North Battleford No. 437, the North Battleford Crown Colony census subdivision shares a boundary with the City of North Battleford to the north and east and is located on the northeast shore of the North Saskatchewan River. The Town Battleford is across the river to the west while the Rural Municipality of Battle River No. 438 is across the river to the south.

Demographics 

In the 2011 Census of Population conducted by Statistics Canada, the North Battleford Crown Colony recorded a population of 164 living in 5 of its 8 total private dwellings, a  change from its 2006 population of 153.

Health care 
The North Battleford Crown Colony is home to the Saskatchewan Hospital North Battleford, a mental health centre, which is located at 1 Jersey Street. It is administered by the Prairie North Health Region. The hospital currently has  beds, though a replacement hospital is currently under construction that will ultimately have 284 beds once construction is completed in spring of 2018.

See also 
 List of communities in Saskatchewan

References 

Unincorporated communities in Saskatchewan
North Battleford No. 437, Saskatchewan
Division No. 16, Saskatchewan